Independencia is the Spanish word for independence. It may refer to:

Places
Independencia, Chile
Independencia Province, Dominican Republic
La Independencia, Chiapas, Mexico
Independencia, Monterrey, Nuevo León, Mexico
Independencia, Paraguay
Villa Independencia, original name of Fray Bentos, Uruguay
Independencia District (disambiguation)
Independencia Municipality (disambiguation)

Ships
 Chilean corvette Independencia (1818)
 Independencia (1843), Yucetechan naval schooner in the Naval Battle of Campeche
 Independencia (Peruvian ship) (1865), Peruvian ironclad, wrecked and blew up in 1879 during the War of the Pacific
 Independencia (1874), ironclad for Brazil whose bungled launch led to bankruptcy of J & W Dudgeon shipbuilders
 Independencia (1874), provisional name of HMS Neptune (1874)
 ARA Independencia (1891), Argentine coastal ship
 ARA Independencia (1958), Argentine aircraft carrier
 USCGC Icarus (WPC-110) (1932), transferred to the Navy of the Dominican Republic and renamed Independencia
 P163 Independencia, an Oaxaca-class patrol vessel of the Mexican Navy
 Independência, a Niterói-class frigate in the Brazilian Navy

Other uses
 Independencia (film), a 2009 Filipino film
 Independencia (Line C Buenos Aires Underground), a metro station in Argentina
 Independencia (Line E Buenos Aires Underground), a metro station in Argentina
 Independencia metro station (Guadalajara), a metro station in Guadalajara, Mexico
 Independence (short film), a 1997 Paraguayan short film
 La Independencia, 1966 album by Argentine singer Jorge Cafrune

See also
 Independência (disambiguation), Portuguese for "independence"
 Independencia Department (disambiguation)
 Independencia, Cochabamba or Ayopaya, a town in Cochabamba Department, Bolivia
 Independence (disambiguation)